Town Hall Theatre may refer to:
Town Hall Theatre (Centerville), Ohio, a theatre company and venue
Town Hall Theatre (Galway), Ireland, an event venue
The Town Hall (New York City), an event venue